Alhambra is a village in Madison County, Illinois, United States. The population was 622 at the 2020 census.

Alhambra is part of the Metro-East region of the St. Louis, MO-IL Metropolitan Statistical Area.

History
Alhambra was laid out in 1849. The name was inspired by Tales of the Alhambra by Washington Irving.

The first cooperative soybean processing unit in Illinois, the Alhambra Grain & Feed Co., was located in the village. It began full production on March 1, 1945.

Geography
Alhambra is located in northeastern Madison County at  (38.888614, -89.732616). Illinois Route 140 passes through the village as Main Street, leading west  to Hamel and east  to Greenville.

The village drains southwest to Silver Creek, a south-flowing tributary of the Kaskaskia River.

Demographics

As of the census of 2000, there were 630 people, 209 households, and 145 families residing in the village. The racial makeup of the village was 98.73% White, and 1.27% from two or more races.

There were 209 households, out of which 28.2% had children under the age of 18 living with them, 59.3% were married couples living together, 5.7% had a female householder with no husband present, and 30.6% were non-families. 27.3% of all households were made up of individuals, and 15.8% had someone living alone who was 65 years of age or older. The average household size was 2.37 and the average family size was 2.90.

In the village, the population was spread out, with 17.1% under the age of 18, 6.5% from 18 to 24, 22.9% from 25 to 44, 19.5% from 45 to 64, and 34.0% who were 65 years of age or older. The median age was 48 years. For every 100 females, there were 78.0 males. For every 100 females age 18 and over, there were 70.0 males.

The median income for a household in the village was $36,818, and the median income for a family was $53,214. Males had a median income of $31,484 versus $22,981 for females. The per capita income for the village was $16,124. About 3.1% of families and 4.7% of the population were below the poverty line, including 4.1% of those under age 18 and 10.6% of those age 65 or over.

References

External links

Villages in Madison County, Illinois
Villages in Illinois
1849 establishments in Illinois